Richard Sebast is an American director, story director, animator, and television producer known for working at companies such as Disney, Hanna-Barbera, Warner Bros., Marvel, MGM, and Universal Animation Studios.

Career
Dick Sebast began his career in 1972 at Walt Disney Productions as an animator on Winnie the Pooh and Tigger Too, The Many Adventures of Winnie the Pooh, and as writer/animator on The Rescuers.

He then joined Hanna-Barbera and worked as a story director on Challenge of the Super Friends, The Ri¢hie Ri¢h/Scooby-Doo Show, and The Fonz and the Happy Days Gang.

He then joined Ruby-Spears Productions and did development and story direction on various projects including, Thundarr the Barbarian, The Plastic Man Comedy/Adventure Show, Goldie Gold and Action Jack, Dragon's Lair, Mister T, Chuck Norris: Karate Kommandos, and Sectaurs.

His next project was as a storyboard artist, character designer and sequence director on the feature animated film, Rover Dangerfield. He directed nine episodes of the first season of Batman: The Animated Series for which he won an Emmy as the director of the episode, "Robin's Reckoning, Part 1".

Following this, he produced and directed the first season of Sonic the Hedgehog for DIC Entertainment. He worked as a storyboard artist on the 1994 TV series, Spider-Man, which he followed up as the producer/director of The Incredible Hulk TV series for New World Animation.

Later he was a storyboard artist on The Legend of Tarzan series for Walt Disney TV Animation and was a director on the TV series Max Steel for Sony Television (Adelaide Productions) and The Mummy for Universal Cartoon Studio.

From 2004 through 2005 he was a director on the Ultimate Avengers II and Doctor Strange direct-to-video features for Marvel/Lion's Gate. In 2006 he joined Universal Animation Studios as the director of a number of episodes of The Land Before Time: The Series.

References

External links
 

American animated film directors
American animated film producers
American animators
American film directors
American male television writers
American storyboard artists
American television directors
American television writers
American television producers
Hanna-Barbera people
Living people
Place of birth missing (living people)
Walt Disney Animation Studios people
Year of birth missing (living people)